Rainer Rochlitz (1946–2002) was a French translator and art historian.

A specialist in aesthetics, Rochlitz contributed a great deal in publicizing the writings of Georg Lukács, Walter Benjamin and Jürgen Habermas in France. He was a researcher at the Centre National de la Recherche Scientifique in Paris and director of seminars at the École des Hautes Études en Sciences Sociales.

References

 Rainer Rochlitz. "Le Vif de la critique" (June 2011): 509.
 Frédéric Maufras. "Le jugement critique a-t-il encore un avenir" (Spring 2003).

1946 births
2002 deaths
Writers from Hanover
Philosophers of art
20th-century French translators
20th-century French male writers
French male non-fiction writers